Highlights is the second studio album by American duo Tanlines. It was released in May 2015 under Tru Thoughts.

Track listing

References

2015 albums